Eric Roux is a French author and a religious leader in the Church of Scientology.

Life

Scientology 

Roux is the President of the Union of the Churches of Scientology of France.  He was appointed vice-president of the European Office of the Church of Scientology for Public Affairs and Human Rights in May 2017. He has been the spokesperson of the Church in France and Belgium, specifically during the 2015-2016 trial. Roux has represented the Church of Scientology at the OSCE since 2009.

He has written two books on Scientology, including France 2012: Inquisition en bande organisée (2012).

Books
 'France 2012: Inquisition en bande organisée. Les Trois Génies, 2012 .
 Tout Savoir sur la Scientologie''. Collection Mystères et Religions, Pierre-Guillaume de Roux, 2018 .

References 

French religious leaders
Scientology officials
Living people
Year of birth missing (living people)